Cooper is small unincorporated community located in southwestern Houston County, Texas, United States, on State Highway 21, nine miles southwest of Crockett, Texas. It was established around 1900, and by the mid-1930s had a church, a cemetery, and a number of houses. Many residents moved away after World War II, and by the early 1990s only a church and a few widely scattered houses remained in the area.

References 

Unincorporated communities in Houston County, Texas
Unincorporated communities in Texas